Judith Emlyn Johnson (formerly Judith Johnson Sherwin) (born 1936) is an American poet.

Life
She graduated from Barnard College cum laude.
She studied at Columbia University, Radcliffe College, and the Juilliard School of Music.

She teaches at State University of New York at Albany.
She was President of the Board of Association of Writers & Writing Programs, and President of the Poetry Society of America. 
She edited 13th Moon, and published The Little Magazine.

Her work appeared in Atlantic Monthly, Chelsea, Harper's, Ms., New York Times, Nimrod, Playboy.
Her intermedia installation / performance piece, "Friedrich Liebermann, American Artist," has been widely exhibited, and is now being developed as a multi-media cd-rom novel.  Her play manuscript "Belisa's Love" is in the Princeton University archives.

She lives in New York City.

Awards
 1969 Yale Series of Younger Poets Competition
 Playboy fiction award
 National Endowment for the Arts Poetry Fellowship
 Poetry Society of America Di Castagnola Prize.

Works
"The Prospector's Complaint: Happy Jack's Rock" Beloit Poetry Journal, Winter 1967–68, p. 34-35
"Sorry, Sweetheart, Here's" Beloit Poetry Journal, Spring 1972
"The House Guest"; "Time for Ripeness", Mother Jones, July 1977
"Before the Recovery", Virginia Quarterly Review, Summer 1979 
"Under the Lights", Ploughshares, Winter 1989 
 Cities of Mathematics and Desire: Poems (Sheep Meadow Press, 2005)
 The Ice Lizard: Poems (Sheep Meadow Press, 1992) 
 Dead 's Good Company (Waste Trilogy III) (Countryman Press, 1979)
 How the Dead Count: Poems (Norton, 1978) 
 Transparencies: Poems (Waste Trilogy II) (Countryman Press, 1978)
 The Town Scold: Poems (Waste Trilogy I) (Countryman Press, 1977)
 Impossible Buildings: Poems (Doubleday, 1972)
 The Life of Riot: Short Stories (Atheneum, 1970)
 Uranium Poems (Yale University Press, 1969)

Editor

References

External links
"Author's website"
Finding aid to Judith Emlyn Johnson papers at Columbia University. Rare Book & Manuscript Library.

1936 births
Living people
Barnard College alumni
American women poets
21st-century American women